Daniel Woodrow Bird Sr. (July 6, 1912 – November 16, 1995) was an American farmer and politician who served in both houses of the Virginia General Assembly. He is best remembered for his pioneering work in establishing community colleges in Virginia which became a model for the rest of the United States.

Career
Bird was a member of the Democratic Party and was first elected to the Virginia House of Delegates in 1947. He remained in that position until January 1956 when he became a state senator. He worked as a senator for the next 15 years; ending his career in 1971 when he chose not to seek reelection. He served as chairman of the Higher Education Study Commission from 1964 through 1966. In that position he played an instrumental role in establishing Virginia's statewide system of community colleges; a success that became a national model.

In the 1950s Bird served as chairman of the Virginia Senate Education Committee during the era of desegregation in the United States. The Washington Post stated, that he "once cast the swing vote to keep the state's public schools open and allow integration to move forward, rather than risk the complete shutdown of the system." At the time of his retirement in 1971, he was chairman of the Senate's agriculture committee.

References

External links 
 

1912 births
1995 deaths
Democratic Party Virginia state senators
20th-century American politicians